Kosmos 2457 ( meaning Cosmos 2457) is one of a set of three Russian military satellites launched in 2009 as part of the GLONASS satellite navigation system. It was launched with Kosmos 2456 and Kosmos 2458.

This satellite is a GLONASS-M satellite, also known as Uragan-M, and is numbered Uragan-M No. 733.

Kosmos 2456/7/8 were launched from Site 81/24 at Baikonur Cosmodrome in Kazakhstan. A Proton-M carrier rocket with a Blok DM upper stage was used to perform the launch which took place at 10:38 UTC on 14 December 2009. The launch successfully placed the satellites into Medium Earth orbit. It subsequently received its Kosmos designation, and the international designator 2009-070B. The United States Space Command assigned it the Satellite Catalog Numbers 36112.

It is in the first orbital plane of the GLONASS constellation, in orbital slot 6. It started operations on 24 January 2010.

See also

List of Kosmos satellites (2251–2500)
List of Proton launches (2000–2009)

References

Spacecraft launched in 2009
Spacecraft launched by Proton rockets
Kosmos satellites